The anime series The Promised Neverland is based on the manga series of the same title, written by Kaiu Shirai and illustrated by Posuka Demizu. The anime television series adaptation was announced in the 26th issue of Weekly Shōnen Jump on May 28, 2018. The series premiered on January 11, 2019 and airs on Fuji TV's late-night Noitamina anime programming block. The series is animated by CloverWorks and directed by Mamoru Kanbe, with Toshiya Ono handling series composition, Kazuaki Shimada handling character designs, and Takahiro Obata composing the series' music. The first season ran for 12 episodes. It is streamed on Amazon Video, but only in Japan, which is contrary to the contract that has Amazon having exclusive streaming rights to shows that have aired on Noitamina since Spring 2016 , as Wakanim has exclusive streaming rights in France. UVERworld performed the series' opening theme song "Touch Off," while Cö shu Nie performed the series' ending theme songs  and "Lamp". Aniplex of America streamed the series on Crunchyroll, Hulu, FunimationNow, and Hidive, starting on January 9, 2019. The series is simulcasted on AnimeLab in Australia and New Zealand.  On March 28, 2019, Adult Swim announced that the anime's first season would air on their Toonami programming block starting on April 14, 2019. Netflix started streaming the series on September 1, 2020 in the United States, Canada and Latin America.

A second season was announced in March 2019. Originally scheduled to premiere in October 2020, it was delayed due to the COVID-19 pandemic. The second season aired on Fuji TV's Noitamina from January 8 to March 26, 2021. The main staff and cast members are returning to reprise their roles.  performs the second season's opening theme song , while Myuk performs the second season's ending theme song .

Series overview

Episode list

Season 1 (2019)

Season 2 (2021)

Notes

References

External links

  
 
 

 
Lists of anime episodes